Eungella Dam is a locality in the Mackay Region, Queensland, Australia.

Geography 

The Eungella Dam is in the centre of the locality at elevation . It creates Lake Eungella. It receives inflows from Broken River and other creeks.

The land to the west of the dam is protected as Crediton Forest Reserve and Crediton State Forest.

History 
The locality takes its name from the dam, which in turn takes its name from the town and pastoral run name, which in turn was named in July 1876 by explorer Ernest Favenc in July 1876. It is believed to be an Aboriginal word, meaning land of cloud.

References 

Mackay Region
Localities in Queensland